Franco Bottari (5 September 1925 – 4 January 1988) was an Italian set designer, screenwriter and film director.

Life and career 
Born in Caserta, Bottari entered the film industry in 1959 as a set decorator. In 1963 he started an intense career as a costume and set designer, being mainly active in genre films.  Occasionally, Bottari also collaborated on screenplays and in 1972 he made his directorial debut with the political drama Guernica (also known as 24 ore... non un minuto di più). Bottari died on 4 January 1988, at the age of 62.

Selected filmography 
Director and screenwriter
 Guernica (1972)
 Voglia di donna (1978)
 La vedova del trullo (1979)

Screenwriter
 The Young, the Evil and the Savage (1968)
 Lips of Lurid Blue (1975)
 Waves of Lust (1975)
 Colt 38 Special Squad (1976)
 Deadly Chase (1978)

References

External links 
 

1925 births
1988 deaths
20th-century Italian people
Italian film directors
Set designers
Italian screenwriters
People from Caserta
Italian male screenwriters